Platylesches ayresii, the peppered hopper, is a butterfly of the family Hesperiidae. It is found in bushveld in Botswana, western Transvaal, KwaZulu-Natal, Mozambique and Zimbabwe. The habitat consists of dry savanna and grassland.

The wingspan is 27–32 mm for males and 35–38 mm for females. Adults are on wing from July to April.

The larvae feed on Parinari capensis.

References

External links
Platylesches ayresii and P. langa are Distinct Species (Lepidoptera; Hesperiidae)

Butterflies described in 1889
Erionotini
Butterflies of Africa
Taxa named by Roland Trimen